Robert Horstink (born 26 December 1981 in Twello, Gelderland) is a volleyball player from the Netherlands, who represented his native country at the 2004 Summer Olympics in Athens, Greece. There he ended up in ninth place with the Dutch Men's National Team. 

He mainly plays as an outside hitter and is known for his vertical jump, his cocky attitude, and his powerful backrow attacks.

References
  Dutch Olympic Committee 

1981 births
Living people
People from Voorst
Dutch men's volleyball players
Volleyball players at the 2004 Summer Olympics
Olympic volleyball players of the Netherlands
Sportspeople from Gelderland